Crystal Tipps and Alistair is a British cartoon produced for the BBC. The title characters are a girl and her dog who are joined by their friends Birdie and Butterfly. There are 50 five-minute episodes and a 20-minute Christmas special, all first shown between 1972 and 1974. It was regularly repeated until 1980. Between 1985 and 1987 the programme aired on Children's ITV (with its BBC TV/Q3 credit replaced by a "Children's ITV" endboard on the 4pm broadcast). In 1990, the BBC claimed back the rights with continued airings until 1994. It was created by Hilary Hayton and Graham McCallum. Michael Grafton-Robinson, a BBC producer went independent setting up Q3 of London to produce the series. The animation was done by Richard Taylor Cartoons, who were also contracted to make the Charley Says and the Protect and Survive public information films for the Central Office of Information.

The series has no dialogue but rather is accompanied by a full musical soundtrack composed by Paul Reade. However, when shown on Captain Kangaroo in the U.S. in the 1970s the series did have voice-over narration by Cosmo "Gus" Allegretti in his high-pitched "Mister Moose" voice.

Episodes
 Birdie
 Butterfly
 Flying High
 The Art Gallery
 Keep Fit
 Fishing
 Party Time
 Decorating
 Sowing Seeds
 Trip to the Seaside
 Yo Yo
 The Postman
 Dressing Up
 Music Makers
 Snow
 It's Quicker By Tube
 Zoo Time
 Spring Cleaning
 Boots
 Chimney Sweep
 The Circus
 On Wheels
 Tennis Time
 The Swimming Pool
 Picnic Time
 Surprise
 Bubbles
 Pussy
 Gardening
 Still Life
 Sailing
 Golf
 Waterworks
 Eastern Magic
 Dough
 The Fortune Teller
 The Monster
 Hotel
 The Dog House
 Trampoline
 Knitting
 Bump in the Night
 Vacuum Cleaner
 Professor
 Cricket
 Kitten Care
 The Farm
 Sculptures
 Topiary
 The Magician

Crystal's Christmas Special was shown on 25 December 1974.

Credits
Designed and Written by: Graham McCallum and Hilary Hayton
Music Composed by: Paul Reade
Animation Directed by: Richard Taylor
Animators: Althea Battams and Maggie Clarke
Produced by: Michael Grafton-Robinson
A BBC TV/Q3 London Co-Production

References

External links
Toonhound – Crystal Tipps and Alistair

BBC children's television shows
1970s British animated television series
English-language television shows
1970s British children's television series
1972 British television series debuts
1974 British television series endings
British children's animated adventure television series